ʿĀṣim ibn ʿUmar (c. 628 – c. 689) was the son of Jamila bint Thabit and Umar ibn al-Khattab, the second Rashidun caliph. Asim was also a famous Hadith scholar.

Biography
Asim was the son of Umar ibn al-Khattab the senior Sahaba of the prophet Muhammad, his mother was also prophet's companion. 

His father, Umar was born in Mecca to the Banu Adi clan, which was responsible for arbitration among the tribes. His mother, Jamila was the daughter of Thabit ibn Abi al-Aflah and Al-Shamus bint Abi Amir, who were both from the 'Amr ibn Awf clan of the Aws tribe in Medina. Her brother Asim was among those who fought at Badr.

His mother, Jamila was one of Medina's first converts to Islam. She and her mother were among the first ten women to pledge allegiance to Muhammad in 622. On hearing that her name was Asiya ("disobedient"), Muhammad renamed her: "No, you are Jamila" ("beautiful").

She married Umar about five years later, between May 627 and May 628. They had one son, Asim ibn Umar. On one occasion, Jamila asked Umar for money, and, as he afterwards reported to Muhammad: 

Jamila and Asim returned to her family in the suburb of Quba. One day Umar arrived in Quba and saw Asim playing in the mosque courtyard. He picked him up and placed him on his mount. Jamila's mother Al-Shamus saw that Umar was taking her grandson away and came up to protest. They could not agree who should have custody of Asim and so they brought their dispute before Abu Bakr. When Abu Bakr ruled, "Do not interfere between a child and its mother," Umar dropped his case and allowed Jamila to keep her son.

Later Jamila was married to Yazid ibn Jariya, and they had one son, Abd al-Rahman. Thus, Asim had a Maternal half-brother from her mother.

Asim was just a four years old when prophet died and he was almost six or seven when caliph Abu Bakr al-Siddiq died. After the death of Abu Bakr (died 634) his father was recognized as the next Caliph by Muslim community.

Contemporary Events in his life
His father became caliph in 634. Under Umar, the caliphate expanded at an unprecedented rate, ruling the Sasanian Empire and more than two-thirds of the Byzantine Empire. his father became most powerful and influential Muslim caliphs in history. However at the height of his power, In 644, Umar was assassinated by a Persian slave named Abu Lu'lu'a Firuz. His motivations for the assassination are not clear. Asim was a very young man when his father died. 

After his father death, Muslim community selected Uthman, who ruled from 644 until his assassination in 17 June 656. Uthman was succeeded by Ali, who was selected as caliph in 656. He ruled until his assassination 661. After the unfortunate death of Ali the Muslim community selected al-Hasan as the Caliph, however he abdicated the throne in favour of Mu'awiya ibn Abi Sufyan the government of Syria, to end the civil war by a pact. Mu'awiya I was recognized as the new Caliph, this marked the end of Rashidun era and beginning of Umayyad era. Mu'awiya was succeeded by Yazid then by Mu'awiya II after that Marwan I in 684 became Caliph because of unexpected premature death of Mu'awiya II. Caliph Marwan was facing major political crisis, however Umayyads emerged victorious under him and his son Abd al-Malik.

Asim died during the early reign of Umayyad caliph Abd al-Malik in 689.

Legacy
Asim ibn Umar was one of the  famous Tabi‘in and one of the notable narrators of hadith.

Family
Among his children are:
Hafs ibn Asim, who in Sahih al-Bukhari alone relates eleven hadith.
Umar ibn Asim, had a daughter named Umm Miskin bint Umar. She had a freed slave named "Abu Malik"
Umm Asim Layla bint Asim, the mother of Umar II, the eight Umayyad Caliph.

References

Sources
 
 

Umar
Tabi‘un
Children of Rashidun caliphs
Tabi‘un hadith narrators
628 births
689 deaths
Banu Adi
7th-century Arabs